Billiken Angels Network (BAN) is an organization of angel investors based in St. Louis, Missouri, that provides equity capital for growing companies, from seed stage to later stages of growth, in any industry, including high technology, medical and biotechnology,  IT, apps, and consumer products. BAN invests between $50,000 and $500,000 in its initial investments, and can invest more in follow-on rounds. BAN primarily invests in firms that are based within a 100-mile radius of St. Louis. The only exceptions made are for firms whose owners have a current or prior student, faculty or staff relationship to Saint Louis University.

BAN is a university-based angel network, founded in 2008 by Prof. Jerome Katz of the Entrepreneurship Program at Saint Louis University's John Cook School of Business. The University provides a sidecar fund that co-invests with BAN's angel members for initial and follow-on investments. A portion of BAN's member dues help support the Entrepreneurship Program's educational and co-curricular efforts, and BAN members are obligated to help the Program out at least twice a year. Given its university mission, BAN offers free public workshops to the St. Louis community on funding startups and pitching to angels.

BAN's angels are accredited investors. But one unique aspect of BAN's membership is the group of Billiken Angel Fellows. These Fellows are volunteers from a variety of professions (medicine, law, engineering, finance, retailing, marketing, IT, etc.) who support the angels through assisting in the screening process and performing due diligence on behalf of the angels. The BAN was recently rated as one of the most active angel investing groups in the Midwest by the Angel Resource Institute with the third highest deal flow among Midwestern Venture organizations.

BAN is a member of the Angel Capital Association, the professional trade group of American angel investor organizations.

Companies in which BAN has invested include Aisle411, BusyEvent,  and EndoStim,  and Helper Helper.

References

Organizations based in St. Louis